Justice Garber may refer to:

John Garber (died 1908), associate justice of the Supreme Court of Nevada
Milton C. Garber (1867–1948), associate justice of the Supreme Court of the Territory of Oklahoma